Signs is a 2018 Polish crime-thriller television series starring Andrzej Konopka, Helena Sujecka, and Michał Czernecki.

Plot
The story takes place in the fictional town of Sowie Doły, in the Owl Mountains. When a woman is murdered at the lake near a local mine, commissioner Michał Trela, the new commander of the town police, who recently moved to Sowie Doły with his daughter, takes on the case. During the investigation, threads from previous years appear, relating both to the recent murder and that of a student a few years before, whose case was never solved.

Cast and characters
 Andrzej Konopka as Commissioner Michał Trela
 Helena Sujecka as Adrianna Nieradka
 Michał Czernecki as Błażej Nieradka
 Piotr Trojan as Krzysztof Sobczyk
 Magdalena Żak as Nina Trela
 Mirosław Kropielnicki as Antoni Paszke
 Mariusz Ostrowski as Targosz
 Andrzej Mastalerz as Marek Zieleniewicz vel Jonasz
 Helena Englert as Agata Paszke
 Małgorzata Hajewska-Krzysztofik as Zofia Bławatska
 Rafał Cieszyński as Priest Roman Śmigielski
 Zbigniew Stryj as Jan Dzikowski
 Robert Gulaczyk as Paweł Piotrowski
 Dobromir Dymecki as Robert Paszke
 Paulina Gałązka as Dorota
 Bianka Pilitowska as Katarzyna Piotrowska
 Karolina Owczarz as Martyna
 Teresa Kwiatkowska as Housekeeper Bogumiła
 Rafał Mohr as Twerski
 Barbara Wypych as Kaja
 Ewa Jakubowicz as Eliza Konieczna
 Krzysztof Zawadzki as Adam
 Sławomir Grzymek as Feliks Szmidt

Release
Signs was released on 10 October 2018 on AXN. A second season was released on 6 May 2020.

References

External links
 
 

2010s Polish television series
Polish-language television shows
Television shows set in Poland
2018 Polish television series debuts